Lycastris flavohirta is a species of syrphid fly in the family Syrphidae.

Distribution
India, Nepal.

References

Eristalinae
Insects described in 1907
Diptera of Asia
Taxa named by Enrico Adelelmo Brunetti